Vice Admiral Olaf Mandt Hustvedt  (23 June 1886 – 22 December 1978) was a senior officer of the United States Navy. He saw service in World War I and World War II, operating in both the Battle of the Atlantic and the Pacific War. During his 36-year career, he distinguished himself as an expert in naval ordnance and as a battleship commander.

Naval career
Hustvedt was born in Chicago, Illinois, on 23 June 1886 to Norwegian immigrant parents. He graduated from the United States Naval Academy in 1909. His first tour of duty was aboard the armored cruiser , in which he cruised from the United States West Coast to many ports in East Asia. He then attended George Washington University in Washington, D.C., from which he received a Master of Science degree in 1914.

In 1914, Hustvedt reported for duty aboard the battleship . In 1916, he became a member of the staff of Commander, Battleship Division 6.

World War I
During World War I, Hustvedt served aboard the battleship  before transferring in 1918 to the battleship  as Oklahomas gunnery officer. Both battleships saw service in European waters during the war, with New York operating with other American battleships of Battleship Division 9 as the 6th Battle Squadron of the Royal Navys Grand Fleet and with Oklahoma seeing service escorting Allied convoys.

Interwar

In 1919, Hustvedt became Chief of the Experimental Division at the U.S. Navys Bureau of Ordnance in Washington, D.C. During his tour, he was among the U.S. Navy observers of United States Army Air Service Brigadier General Billy Mitchells bombing demonstrations against decommissioned American battleships in the Chesapeake Bay in September 1921. He also played a role in giving rocket pioneer Dr. Robert Goddard his first U.S. government contract and approved a contract for Carl Norden to work on the famous Norden bombsight for the Navy.

Hustvedt was promoted to lieutenant commander in 1921, when he became commanding officer of the light minelayer . In 1924 he returned to the Bureau of Ordnance. He was assigned to the battleship  in 1927, then transferred in 1928 to the battleship  as the gunnery officer of a battleship division of the Battle Fleet. He moved on in 1930 to duty at the Naval Gun Factory at the Washington Navy Yard in Washington, D.C.

In 1933, Hustvedt was promoted to commander and became executive officer of the heavy cruiser , then moved to the staff of the Chief of Naval Operations in Washington, D.C., in 1935. In 1938 he was promoted to captain and took command of the light cruiser . In 1939 he joined the staff of the Commander, Battle Force, United States Fleet, Admiral James O. Richardson, serving aboard Richardsons flagship, the battleship , as Richardsons operations officer before reporting to the New York Navy Yard in Brooklyn, New York, to oversee the fitting out of the new battleship . He became North Carolinas first commanding officer upon her commissioning on 9 April 1941. On 23 October 1941, Hustvedt became chief of staff for the Commander-in-Chief, United States Atlantic Fleet, Admiral Ernest J. King.

At some point during the interwar period, Hustvedt attended the Naval War College.

World War II

Atlantic Theater
After the United States entered World War II on 8 December 1941, Hustvedt remained Kings chief of staff until King became Commander-in-Chief, United States Fleet, on 30 December 1941, then continued his duties as chief of staff for the Atlantic Fleet when Vice Admiral Royal E. Ingersoll became the Fleets commander-in-chief on 1 January 1942. Hustvedt remained Ingersolls chief of staff until 8 May 1943, when he was promoted to rear admiral and became Commander, Battleships, Atlantic Fleet. Tirpitz did not come out, and the American battleships departed in August 1943 for the Pacific Theater for operations against the Japanese.

Hustvedt remained with the U.S. Navy forces at Scapa Flow. Rangers aircraft made two attacks on 4 October 1943, the first one damaging two German ships in a convoy in the North Sea before continuing to Bodø and sinking two small German merchant ships there in exchange for the loss of two aircraft, while the second strike sank a large merchant ship and a small coastal merchantman at Bodø and forced another large cargo ship to beach herself with heavy damage, losing three planes in the process. When three German aircraft later approached the Allied task force in the North Sea, Rangers combat air patrol immediately shot two of them down. Hustvedt commented that Operation Leader had demonstrated that Royal Navy and U.S. Navy ships and aircraft could operate together with "effectiveness, mutual understanding, and complete cooperation."

Pacific Theater

Hustvedts first major Pacific action was Operation Flintlock, the American invasion of the Marshall Islands in January and February 1944, during which Battleship Division 7 was part of the escort of Task Group 58.3 (Carrier Task Group 3). During Flintlock, Hustvedt participated in Operation Hailstone, a U.S. Navy combined surface and air attack on the major Japanese base at Truk Atoll on 17–18 February 1944. Detached from Task Group 50.3, his two battleships served as the center of Task Force 50.9 when it conducted a cruise around Truk under the command of Admiral Raymond A. Spruance on 17 February to intercept Japanese ships fleeing U.S. Navy airstrikes against the atoll. Late in the morning that day, a lone Japanese Mitsubishi A6M Zero (Allied reporting name "Zeke") dropped a bomb close aboard Iowa alongside the bridge wing where Hustvedt was eating lunch; his reaction was simply to say "That was my bomb" and continue eating. His two battleships went on to cripple the Japanese destroyer Maikaze – which was finished off by accompanying heavy cruisers – and to straddle the Japanese destroyer Nowaki at the extreme range of 34,000 to 39,000 yards (10,363 to 11,887 meters), although Nowaki escaped without damage and managed to fire a torpedo which passed close to New Jersey across her bow.

Hustvedt also commanded Battleship Division 7 during the Battle of the Philippine Sea in June 1944. During the action, his two battleships were among those assigned to Vice Admiral Willis A. Lees Task Group 58.7 (Battle Line), which served as an antiaircraft screen against Japanese aircraft attempting to overfly the battleships on their way to strike at the American aircraft carrier force. Admiral Spruance, in overall command, canceled his original plan to send the battleships forward in pursuit of the Japanese fleet after the virtual destruction of Japanese air power in the area, so no surface engagement took place.

Later career
Later in 1944, Hustvedt returned to Washington, D.C., where he became a member of the General Board of the United States Navy on 24 October 1944. He served in this capacity until he retired from the Navy in 1946, being promoted to vice admiral upon retirement.

Hustvedts career as a battleship officer had been a promising one and he had a good reputation prior to World War II. The rise of the aircraft carrier to dominance in naval warfare during that war left him with little opportunity to demonstrate his capabilities as a combat leader and prevented his possible emergence as a major World War II naval commander.

Awards
Hustvedt received two awards of the Legion of Merit during his career. In addition, the United Kingdom invested him as a Knight Commander Order of the British Empire.

Personal life
Hustvedt was married to Irene Cooper Hustvedt (1894–1990), a daughter of the Republic of Hawaii's co-founder Henry E. Cooper, and was survived by three children. A son, Erling H. Hustvedt (1919–2001), entered the U.S. Naval Academy in 1937 and, although dropped from the academy due to an incorrect evaluation of his eyesight, went on to become a Navy officer, seeing extensive service during World War II.  A grandson, Frederick Hauck (b. 1941), became a U.S. Navy officer, fighter pilot, and astronaut in the National Aeronautics and Space Administrations Space Shuttle Program.

Death
Hustvedt died of heart disease at his home in Washington, D.C., on 22 December 1978. He is buried at Arlington National Cemetery in Arlington, Virginia.

Awards
 Legion of Merit (two awards)
 Mexican Service Medal
 World War I Victory Medal
 American Defense Service Medal (two awards)
 American Campaign Medal
 European–African–Middle Eastern Campaign Medal (two awards)
 Asiatic–Pacific Campaign Medal (five awards)
 World War II Victory Medal
 Order of the British Empire (United Kingdom)

Gallery

Notes

References
 Dictionary of American Naval Fighting Ships: USS North Carolina 
 Frank, Richard B., "Picking Winners?", Naval History, June 2011.
The Pacific War Online Encyclopedia: Hustvedt, Olaf M. (1886–1978)
Naval History and Heritage Command: Sources on U.S. Naval History in the United States
navsource.org NavSource Online: Battleship Photo Archive BB-8 USS ALABAMA 1915 – 1924
U.S. Naval Institute: Hustvedt, Olaf M. (1886–1978)
East Carolina University Joyner Library Collection Guide: Preliminary Inventory of the Erling H. Hustvedt Oral History Interview, November 22, 1985
Broad, William J., "Back Into Space," The New York Times Magazine, July 3, 1988.
The Capital, December 28, 1978
faqs.org People Search: HUSTVEDT: OLAF, RICHARD, DAVID – people search, genealogy, find relatives and locate ancestors
Erling H Hustvedt (1919–2001)
"Erling Halvor Hustvedt, 81, Dies; Financial Adviser and Manager", The Washington, January 24, 2001
 Morison, Samuel Eliot. History of United States Naval Operations in World War II, Volume VII: Aleutians, Gilberts, and Marshalls, June 1942 – April 1944, Boston: Little, Brown, and Company, 1984.
 Morison, Samuel Eliot. History of United States Naval Operations in World War II, Volume VIII: New Guinea and the Marianas, March 1944 – August 1944, Boston: Little, Brown, and Company, 1989.
 Morison, Samuel Eliot. History of United States Naval Operations in World War II, Volume X: The Atlantic Battle Won, May 1943 – May 1945, Boston: Little, Brown, and Company, 1990.

1886 births
1978 deaths
People from Chicago
American people of Norwegian descent
United States Naval Academy alumni
George Washington University alumni
Naval War College alumni
United States Navy personnel of World War I
United States Navy admirals
United States Navy World War II admirals
Recipients of the Legion of Merit
Honorary Officers of the Order of the British Empire
Burials at Arlington National Cemetery